John XXIII College is a Roman Catholic co-educational secondary day school in located in Mount Claremont, a western suburb of Perth, Western Australia.  The school provides education from kindergarten to Year 12 students and operates under the authority of the Catholic Archbishop of Perth.

The college is the result of the merger in 1977 of the Jesuit Saint Louis boys school spread over different campuses (first opened in 1938) and Loreto Convent girls school (first opened in 1897).  In 1986 the school was relocated to its present site in Mount Claremont.

Academics
The school has performed well in the Western Australian Certificate of Education (WACE) exams and is often rated in the top 50 schools in the state, achieving the 10th highest ATAR results in Western Australia in 2021

The class of 2015 had a 100% achievement of WACE, 89% of the graduating students were studying an ATAR pathway, the Median ATAR was 90.3 and 75 students achieved an ATAR in the 90s.

School sports 
John XXIII College offers a wide range of sports. Annual sports carnivals include athletics, cross country and swimming. John XXIII provide many sporting opportunities including rowing, swimming, rugby, athletics, football, basketball, soccer, cross country, volleyball and netball. 
Among the school's alumni is Australian swimmer and world record holder Eamon Sullivan. In 2008, John XXIII students beat two of Sullivan's school swimming records in the inter-house swimming carnival.

House system 
As with most Australian schools, John XXIII College utilises a house system through which students participate in inter-house activities and competitions. There are six houses at the college:
 Campion (purple)
 Koolyangarra (green)
 Loreto (blue)
 Loyola (white)
 St Louis (red)
 Ward (yellow)

Notable alumni
Some of John XXIII's former students include:

Katrina Porter - Paralympic athlete
Claire Bevilacqua - Pro surfer
Judy Davis - Actress
Matt de Boer - Australian Rules Football player 
Elk Road - Australian Record Producer 
Lucy Durack - Singer and actress
Judy Edwards - Politician
Allan Fels - Chairman of Australian Competition and Consumer Commission 
Robert French - Former Chief Justice of the High Court of Australia
Eileen Joyce - Pianist
Jessica Marais - Actress
Robert Mazza - Justice of the Supreme Court of Western Australia
Paul Medhurst - Australian Rules Football player 
Kevin Parker and Dominic Simper - Tame Impala members
Amanda Sainsbury-Salis - Scientist and author
Eamon Sullivan - Swimmer
John Toohey - Justice of the High Court of Australia
Peter Quinlan, Chief Justice of Western Australia from 2018
Hollie Hughes (politician)
Celia Hammond (politician)
Roz Hammond - Actress
Kate Chaney - lawyer, businesswoman and politician

Pilgrimages 
The College benefits greatly from ongoing links with the Loreto and Jesuit orders that have enabled students to take part in pilgrimages. Year 11 students are invited to participate in the College Pilgrimage Program whereby up to 90 students spend two weeks in the following places:
	Vietnam (Ho Chi Minh City)
	India 
       Timor Leste (East Timor) 
	Alice Springs
       Cambodia
   Northern Territory

Sister schools
John XXIII's sister schools are:
 Loreto Normanhurst N.S.W.
 Loreto Kirribilli N.S.W.
 Loreto Nedlands WA
 Loreto Marryatville SA
 Loreto Cooperoo QLD
 Loreto Ballarat VIC
 Loreto Mandaville Hall Toorak VIC

See also 
 List of schools in the Perth metropolitan area

References

External links 

Catholic secondary schools in Perth, Western Australia
Junior School Heads Association of Australia Member Schools in Western Australia
Catholic primary schools in Perth, Western Australia
Educational institutions established in 1977
1977 establishments in Australia
Mount Claremont, Western Australia